HMS Truant (N68) was a T-class submarine of the Royal Navy. She was laid down by Vickers Armstrong, Barrow and launched on 5 May 1939.

Career

Truant had a relatively active career serving in the main naval theatres of war – Home waters, the Mediterranean, and the Pacific Far East.

Home waters

Truant later attacked the British merchant , unaware that it had been recently captured from the Germans, but her torpedoes missed. She also intercepted the German merchant Tropic Sea. Tropic Sea had formerly been in Norwegian service, but had been captured by the German armed merchant cruiser  in the South Pacific. As well as 8,000 tons of wheat, she had on board the captain and 22 survivors of the British SS Haxby, which had been sunk by the raider, as well as her own Norwegian crew. Tropic Sea was scuttled by the German prize crew in the Bay of Biscay. Truant embarked the captain and survivors of Haxby, and the master of Tropic Sea and his wife. The majority of the Norwegians were rescued by British flying boats.

Clydes torpedoes missed.

Mediterranean

She also unsuccessfully attacked the Italian merchant vessels Utilitas, Silvia Tripcovich, Bainsizza and Arborea, the small Italian tanker Labor and the German merchantman Bellona.

Far East

Truant was assigned to operate in the Far East, against Japanese shipping in 1942. She was present for the beginning of the Battle of Badung Strait and spotted the Japanese covering force, launching an attack at the light cruiser Nagara but scored no hits, although the crew said to have heard two impact noises from dud torpedoes hitting the target. She sunk the Japanese merchant ships Yae Maru and Shunsei Maru in the Malacca Strait. She almost sunk a large liner, but held off as poorly displayed hospital markings were spotted (possibly the Hikawa Maru). A few days after she engaged in a gun battle with the Japanese army cargo ship Tamon Maru No.1, which sank shortly after. This was her final patrol as she started to experience engine trouble.

Back to home waters 
By this point Truant was in need of various repairs and refits, and was sent back to the UK, taking part in several exercises en route. Starting in December 1942 her refit was not finished until May 1943. After this she took part in training exercises, with one sortie to hunt for Tirpitz. She was ordered back to the Far East, but on the way her engine troubles flared up again and she returned home. She did not sortie again, instead being used as a trials ship for 1945, including snorkel tests.

Post war

Truant survived the war and was sold to be broken up for scrap on 19 December 1945. She was wrecked in December 1946 whilst en route to the shipbreakers.

References

External links
 IWM Interview with Rear-Admiral Christopher Haynes Hutchinson, DSO, OBE, who commanded HMS Truant during the Norwegian campaign

British T-class submarines of the Royal Navy
Ships built in Barrow-in-Furness
1939 ships
World War II submarines of the United Kingdom